Niževec is a small settlement southeast of Borovnica in the Inner Carniola region of Slovenia.

References

External links

Niževec on Geopedia

Populated places in the Municipality of Borovnica